Sport1 Medien AG (previously known as Constantin Medien AG and EM.TV) is a media company based in Ismaning near Munich which operates internationally.

History 

 1989 - EM.TV was founded by Thomas Haffa. The name "EM.TV" stands for "Entertainment, Merchandising, TV."
 1996 - The company created Junior, a company and TV channel that held licenses to most of the animated TV shows in the library of the KirchGruppe, the Media Group of Leo Kirch, where Thomas Haffa started his career.
 1997 - EM.TV went public and started to expand in various businesses.
 1999 - EM.TV acquired TMG (Tele München Gruppe).
 1999 - Junior sets up a home video company called Planet Junior. The company then expands into Spain and Italy.
 2000 - In February, EM.TV buys The Jim Henson Company for $680 million.
 2000 - When EM.TV's market capitalization was about €10 billion, the company acquired the Jim Henson Company and 50% of SLEC Ltd., the holding company of the famous Formula One racing series. Because of an option to purchase another 25% of SLEC Ltd. from Bernie Ecclestone for 1 Billion EUR, EM.TV had problems funding the transaction via the capital markets.
 Between late 2000, when the company reported incorrect quarterly results, and 2002, EM.TV's stock fell from its price of €120 EUR to penny stock status.
 2001 - In September, Werner Klatten, the former CEO of Sat.1, became the new CEO of EM.TV. He restructured the company, announced that he would sell: SLEC holding (via Gerhard Gribkowsky); Jim Henson Company; and TMG; and directed the purchase of DSF, a German sports TV station. During the restructuring, the bondholders of a 1999-issued €400 million bond got nearly 60% in company stock in exchange for their bonds.
 2003 - In July, The Jim Henson Company was purchased by the Henson family again from EM.TV for $78 million.
 2007 - The company purchased a stake in the Swiss media company Highlight Communications AG, which in 2008 was increased gradually to 47.3%. 
 2008 - The company changed its name to EM.Sport Media AG. Studio 100 acquires the children's catalogue of EM.TV for €41 million.
 2009 - The company changed its name to Constantin Medien AG.

On February 13, 2018, a takeover by Highlight Communications AG was completed. On September 26, 2019, the company was delisted from the Frankfurt Stock Exchange.

At the Annual General Meeting 2019, the change of name to Sport1 Medien AG was resolved. The change was entered in the Commercial Register of the City of Munich (HRB 148 760) on January 2, 2020 and thus became effective. The change of name is also accompanied by a change in the Company's purpose, which was also resolved by the Annual General Meeting in July last year and is now more strongly aligned to the Company's activities in the digital sector.

Ownership structure
Ownership structure as of December 31, 2019:

Shareholdings 
The subsidiaries of Sport1 Medien AG include Sport1 GmbH, Magic Sports Media GmbH, Match IQ GmbH, PLAZAMEDIA GmbH and LEITMOTIF Creators GmbH. In December 2019, the Marketing Segment, which previously belonged to Sport1 Media GmbH, was also integrated under Sport1 GmbH. 

Beyond the activities of Sport1, the Sport1 Medien AG corporate portfolio includes MAGIC SPORTS MEDIA as a marketing company in the betting, poker, casino and lottery sectors, Match IQ as the full-service sports event and consulting agency for associations, leagues and clubs for internationalization, match day management and the organization of friendly matches, tournaments, training camps and trips abroad, PLAZAMEDIA in the sports and entertainment area for media channels and LEITMOTIF as consulting unit for companies and brands. Within the scope of their business activities, these companies also continue to focus on third-party business.

References 

Mass media companies of Germany
Mass media in Munich
Companies based in Munich
Film production companies of Germany
Mass media companies established in 1989
1989 establishments in West Germany
German companies established in 1989